Uribe-class patrol vessels are offshore patrol vessels in use by the Mexican Navy.

Description 
The class was developed by the Spanish company Empresa Nacional Bazán in 1982. It is a multi-role patrol craft with twin funnels and a helicopter deck. These ships have their main armament, a single 40 mm L70 DP gun, located at 'B' position. Ships of the Uribe class were the first vessels of the Mexican Navy able to operate MBB Bo 105 helicopters on board.

Ships 
 ARM Uribe (P121) (1982) – "Sunk off the coast of Rosarito, Mexico to create the first artificial reef in Baja California."
 ARM Azueta (P122) (1982)
 ARM Baranda (P123) (1983)
 ARM Bretón (P124) (1983)
 ARM Blanco (P125) (1983)
 ARM Monasterio (P126) (1983)

See also

References

Notes

Bibliography 
Faulkner, K. (1999) Jane's Warship Recognition Guide. 2nd Edition. London: HarperCollins Publishers.
Friedman, N. (1997) The Naval Institute Guide to World Naval Weapons Systems, 1997–1998. US Naval Institute Press.  
Wertheim, E. (2007) Naval Institute Guide to Combat Fleets of the World: Their Ships, Aircraft, and Systems. 15 edition. US Naval Institute Press.

Patrol vessels of the Mexican Navy
Patrol ship classes
Ships built in Spain